The Warro National Park is a national park in Queensland, Australia with a size of .

Location 
The closest town is Gin Gin. From the city of Gin Gin, the park can be reached via the Bruce Highway in a northerly direction. In the south, the national park borders on Lake Monduran. However, there are no visitor facilities.

The national parks of Bania, Bulburin, Littabella and Mount Colosseum are nearby.

Flora and fauna 
The national park protects an up to 410 meters high, dry rainforest and an eucalyptus forest.

The park is home to numerous birds, especially the coconut lorikeet (Trichoglossus haematodus moluccanus), the rufous whistler (Pachycephala rufiventris), the grey shrikethrush (Colluricincla harmonica) and the noisy friarbird (Philemon corniculatus). The frogs often include species from Hylidae and Australian common frog families, such as Platyplectrum ornatum. In addition, some endangered plant species are native to the park, such as Argophyllum nullumense, Kunzea flavescens and Eucalyptus decolor.

References 

National parks of Queensland